The Andean Region is one of the 10 administrative regions in which Venezuela was divided for its development plans in 1969.

Description
The region is composed by the states of Mérida, Táchira, Trujillo and Barinas and is located straddling the Andes Mountain Range. Except for the people of the Llanos in Eastern Barinas, natives from this region are usually referred to as "gochos".

It has a total population of 3,607,720 and a density of 39,84 people per square kilometer. The Andean region makes up a mountain-like system with moors, lagoons, valleys, towns and many churches, and within these places it is possible to experience a wide variety of weather, like: mild, gelid, dry, humid and warm weather.
In its total area of 90.552 km2; savannah landscapes, rain forests, gelid desert zones with desert-like vegetation and moors of perpetual snow can be seen. This region is known for having significantly more tempered weather than the rest of the country.

The largest city in this region is San Cristóbal in Táchira State.

Its maximum elevation sits at 4,978 metres above sea level, and the minimum at the mean sea level.

Its major natural attractions are the moors and the high mountains. Actually, the Venezuelan Andean region has the Mérida state in it, which has the highest elevation in the country at 4,978 metres with the Bolívar Mountain.

Economy
Economical activities in the region concentrate farming and many animal, coffee and fish production, as well as tourism and handcrafts. The ULA is the largest university in the Venezuelan Andes and it has campuses in the three major Andean states: Mérida, Táchira and Trujillo.

For commercial trade, the region has a fluvial exit through Lake Maracaibo using the port of La Ceiba in the Trujillo state. However, its major linking with other foreign countries happens in the international boundary of Táchira with the Republic of Colombia through the customs of San Antonio and Ureña, both of them Tachiran locations.

Gallery

Notes

References

Further reading 
 

Regions of Venezuela